In two-dimensional conformal field theory, Virasoro conformal blocks (named after Miguel Ángel Virasoro) are special functions that serve as building blocks of correlation functions. On a given punctured Riemann surface, Virasoro conformal blocks form a particular basis of the space of solutions of the conformal Ward identites. Zero-point blocks on the torus are characters of representations of the Virasoro algebra; four-point blocks on the sphere reduce to hypergeometric functions in special cases, but are in general much more complicated. In two dimensions as in other dimensions, conformal blocks play an essential role in the conformal bootstrap approach to conformal field theory.

Definition

Definition from OPEs 

Using operator product expansions (OPEs), 
an -point function on the sphere can be written as a combination of three-point structure constants, and universal quantities called -point conformal blocks.

Given an -point function, 
there are several types of conformal blocks, depending on which OPEs are used. In the case , there are three types of conformal blocks, corresponding to three possible decompositions of the same four-point function. Schematically, these decompositions read

The sums are over representations of the conformal algebra that appear in the CFT's spectrum. OPEs involve sums over the spectrum, i.e. over representations and over states in representations, but the sums over states are absorbed in the conformal blocks.

In two dimensions, the symmetry algebra factorizes into two copies of the Virasoro algebra, called left-moving and right-moving. If the fields are factorized too, then the conformal blocks factorize as well, and the factors are called Virasoro conformal blocks. The factorization of a conformal block into Virasoro conformal blocks is of the type

where  are representations of the left- and right-moving Virasoro algebras respectively.

Definition from Virasoro Ward identities 

Conformal Ward identities are the linear equations that correlation functions obey, as a result of conformal symmetry.

In two dimensions, conformal Ward identities decompose into left-moving and right-moving Virasoro Ward identities. Virasoro conformal blocks are solutions of the Virasoro Ward identities.

OPEs define specific bases of Virasoro conformal blocks, such as the s-channel basis in the case of four-point blocks. The blocks that are defined from OPEs are special cases of the blocks that are defined from Ward identities.

Properties 

Any linear holomorphic equation that is obeyed by a correlation function, must also hold for the corresponding conformal blocks. In addition, specific bases of conformal blocks come with extra properties that are not inherited from the correlation function.

Conformal blocks that involve only primary fields have relatively simple properties. Conformal blocks that involve descendant fields can then be deduced using local Ward identities. An s-channel four-point block of primary fields depends on the four fields' conformal dimensions  on their positions  and on the s-channel conformal dimension . It can be written as  where the dependence on the Virasoro algebra's central charge is kept implicit.

Linear equations 

From the corresponding correlation function, conformal blocks inherit linear equations: global and local Ward identities, and BPZ equations if at least one field is degenerate.

In particular, in an -point block on the sphere, global Ward identities reduce the dependence on the  field positions to a dependence on  cross-ratios. In the case 

where  and

is the cross-ratio, and the reduced block  coincides with the original block where three positions are sent to

Singularities 

Like correlation functions, conformal blocks are singular when two fields coincide. Unlike correlation functions, conformal blocks have very simple behaviours at some of these singularities. As a consequence of their definition from OPEs, s-channel four-point blocks obey

For a differential equation of order , the  characteristic exponents correspond to the  values of  that are allowed by the fusion rules.

Field permutations 

Permutations of the fields  leave the correlation function

invariant, and therefore relate different bases of conformal blocks with one another. In the case of four-point blocks, t-channel blocks are related to s-channel blocks by

or equivalently

Fusing matrix 

The change of bases from s-channel to t-channel four-point blocks is characterized by the fusing matrix (or fusion kernel) , such that

The fusing matrix is a function of the central charge and conformal dimensions, but it does not depend on the positions  The momentum  is defined in terms of the dimension  by

The values  correspond to the spectrum of Liouville theory.

We also need to introduce two parameters  related to the central charge ,

where  is a double gamma function,

In the expression for the fusing matrix, the integral is a hyperbolic Barnes integral. Up to normalization, the fusing matrix coincides with Ruijsenaars' hypergeometric function, with the arguments  and parameters .

In -point blocks on the sphere, the change of bases between two sets of blocks that are defined from different sequences of OPEs can always be written in terms of the fusing matrix, and a simple matrix that describes the permutation of the first two fields in an s-channel block,

Computation of conformal blocks

From the definition 

The definition from OPEs leads to an expression for an s-channel four-point conformal block as a sum over states in the s-channel representation, of the type
 

Such generators correspond to basis states in the Verma module with the conformal dimension . 

(In particular,  does not depend on the central charge .)

Zamolodchikov's recursive representation 

In Alexei Zamolodchikov's recursive representation of four-point blocks on the sphere, the cross-ratio  appears via the nome 
 
where  is the hypergeometric function, and we used the Jacobi theta functions 

The representation is of the type

In this formula, the positions  of the poles are the dimensions of degenerate representations, which correspond to the momentums

The residues  are given by 

The recursion relation for  can be solved, giving rise to an explicit (but impractical) formula.

Both representations can be generalized to -point Virasoro conformal blocks on arbitrary Riemann surfaces.

From the relation to instanton counting  

The Alday–Gaiotto–Tachikawa relation between two-dimensional conformal field theory  and supersymmetric gauge theory, more specifically, between the conformal blocks of Liouville theory and Nekrasov partition functions of supersymmetric gauge theories in four dimensions, leads to combinatorial expressions for conformal blocks as sums over Young diagrams. Each diagram can be interpreted as a state in a representation of the Virasoro algebra, times an abelian affine Lie algebra.

Special cases

Zero-point blocks on the torus 
A zero-point block does not depend on field positions, but it depends on the moduli of the underlying Riemann surface. In the case of the torus

that dependence is better written through  and the zero-point block associated to a representation  of the Virasoro algebra is

where  is a generator of the Virasoro algebra. This coincides with the character of  The characters of some highest-weight representations are:

 Verma module with conformal dimension :
 
where  is the Dedekind eta function.

 Degenerate representation with the momentum :

 Fully degenerate representation at rational :

The characters transform linearly under the modular transformations:

In particular their transformation under  is described by the modular S-matrix. Using the S-matrix, constraints on a CFT's spectrum can be derived from the modular invariance of the torus partition function, leading in particular to the ADE classification of minimal models.

One-point blocks on the torus 

An arbitrary one-point block on the torus can be written in terms of a four-point block on the sphere at a different central charge. This relation maps the modulus of the torus to the cross-ratio of the four points' positions, and three of the four fields on the sphere have the fixed momentum :

where 
  is the non-trivial factor of the sphere four-point block in Zamolodchikov's recursive representation, written in terms of momentums  instead of dimensions .
  is the non-trivial factor of the torus one-point block , where  is the Dedekind eta function, the modular parameter  of the torus is such that , and the field on the torus has the dimension .

The recursive representation of one-point blocks on the torus is

where the residues are 

Under modular transformations, one-point blocks on the torus behave as 

where the modular kernel is

Hypergeometric blocks 

For a four-point function on the sphere

where one field has a null vector at level two, the second-order BPZ equation reduces to the hypergeometric equation. A basis of solutions is made of the two s-channel conformal blocks that are allowed by the fusion rules, and these blocks can be written in terms of the hypergeometric function,

with  Another basis is made of the two t-channel conformal blocks,

The fusing matrix is the  matrix of size two such that

whose explicit expression is

Hypergeometric conformal blocks play an important role in the analytic bootstrap approach to two-dimensional CFT.

Solutions of the Painlevé VI equation 

If  then certain linear combinations of s-channel conformal blocks are solutions of the Painlevé VI nonlinear differential equation. The relevant linear combinations involve sums over sets of momentums of the type  This allows conformal blocks to be deduced from solutions of the Painlevé VI equation and vice versa. This also leads to a relatively simple formula for the fusing matrix at  Curiously, the  limit of conformal blocks is also related to the Painlevé VI equation.

Generalizations

Other representations of the Virasoro algebra 

The Virasoro conformal blocks that are described in this article are associated to a certain type of representations of the Virasoro algebra: highest-weight representations, in other words Verma modules and their cosets. Correlation functions that involve other types of representations give rise to other types of conformal blocks. For example:
 Logarithmic conformal field theory involves representations where the Virasoro generator  is not diagonalizable, which give rise to blocks that depend logarithmically on field positions. 
 Representations can be built from states on which some annihilation modes of the Virasoro algebra act diagonally, rather than vanishing. The corresponding conformal blocks have been called irregular conformal blocks.

Larger symmetry algebras 
In a theory whose symmetry algebra is larger than the Virasoro algebra, for example a WZW model or a theory with W-symmetry, correlation functions can in principle be decomposed into Virasoro conformal blocks, but that decomposition typically involves too many terms to be useful. Instead, it is possible to use conformal blocks based on the larger algebra: for example, in a WZW model, conformal blocks based on the corresponding affine Lie algebra, which obey Knizhnik–Zamolodchikov equations.

References 

Conformal field theory